TLS may refer to:

Computing
 Transport Layer Security, a cryptographic protocol for secure computer network communication
 Thread level speculation, an optimisation on multiprocessor CPUs
 Thread-local storage, a mechanism for allocating variables in computer science
 Transparent LAN Service, a transparent data link connecting remote Ethernet networks

Media
 Theaterlexikon der Schweiz, an encyclopedia about theatre in Switzerland
 The Times Literary Supplement, a British weekly literary review
 Town Life Stuff, one of The Sims 3 Stuff packs

Organisations
 Telstra (ASX code), an Australian telecommunications and media company
 Trans Link Systems B.V., a company delivering the OV-chipkaart system to public-transport operators in the Netherlands.
 Transmitter Location Systems, a US satellite radio interference geolocation company

Education
 The Lindsey School, a secondary school in Cleethorpes, North East Lincolnshire, England
 Tallinn Law School, in Estonia
 Torrey Life Science, a biology organization of the University of Connecticut, US
 Trinity Law School, in Santa Ana, California, US
 Trinity Lutheran School (disambiguation), several schools in the US
 Tulane University Law School, in New Orleans, Louisiana, US

Science, medicine and technology
 Thüringer Landessternwarte Tautenburg, the Karl Schwarzschild Observatory, in Tautenburg, Thuringia, Germany
 Terrestrial laser scanning, a 3D laser scanning method
 Total least squares, a statistical analysis
 Translesion synthesis, a form of DNA repair
 Transponder landing system, an airplane landing system
 Tumor lysis syndrome, a group of metabolic complications that can occur after treatment of cancer
 Tunable laser spectrometer, an instrument in the Mars rover suite Sample Analysis at Mars
 Two-level system, a quantum system

Transport
 Thorpe-le-Soken railway station, Tendring, England (National Rail station code)
 Toulouse–Blagnac Airport (IATA code)

Other uses
 East Timor (IOC code)